The Tărățel is a right tributary of the river Blahnița in Romania. It discharges into the Blahnița near the town Târgu Cărbunești.

References

Rivers of Romania
Rivers of Gorj County